Pierre Champagne de Labriolle (18 June 1874 – 28 December 1940) was a French philologist, Latinist and historian.

Biography
Pierre Champagne de Labriolle, conventionally known as Pierre de Labriolle, was born in Asnières-sur-Seine, Île-de-France on 18 June 1874. He was educated at the University of Paris. He was employed as a professor of French literature at the Université Laval in Montreal in 1898–1901, and of Latin language and literature at the University of Fribourg in 1904–1919, University of Poitiers in 1919–1926 and University of Paris (faculté des lettres de Paris) from 1926 until May 1940.

Labriolle specialised in early Christian literature in Latin and in particular Tertullian. Among his most notable works are History and Literature of Christianity from Tertullian to Boethius (1920) and La Réaction païenne : étude sur la polémique antichrétienne du Ier au VIe siècle (1934). According to the scholar John Granger Cook, writing in 2000, the latter work was "still unsurpassed in its scope and erudition".

Labriolle was the father of the Slavist François de Labriolle.

List of works
 Un apologiste du IVe siècle, Lactance, Librairie de Montligeon, 1904
 Saint Vincent de Lérins, Paris, Bloud, 1905
 Tertullien jurisconsulte, Paris, L. Larose et L. Tenin, 1906
 Saint Ambroise, Paris, Bloud, 1908
 La correspondance d'Ausone et de Paulin de Nole : avec une étude critique, des notes et un appendice sur la question du Christianisme d'Ausone, Paris, Bloud, 1910 
 La crise montaniste, Paris, Ernest Leroux, 1913
 Les sources de l'histoire du montanisme, Paris, Ernest Leroux, 1913
 Histoire de la littérature latine chrétienne, Paris, Les Belles Lettres, 1920
 Les Satires de Juvénal : Étude et Analyse, Paris, Mellottée, 1932
 La Réaction païenne : étude sur la polémique antichrétienne du Ier au VIe siècle, Paris, L'Artisan du Livre, 1934

Works in English translation
 History and Literature of Christianity from Tertullian to Boethius, tr. Herbert Wilson, London, Kegan Paul, Trench, Trübner & Co., 1924
 The Life and Times of St. Ambrose, tr. Herbert Wilson, St. Louis, B. Herder Book Co., 1928

References

Further reading

External links
 

1874 births
1940 deaths
20th-century philologists
20th-century French historians
French Latinists
Classical philologists
French historians of religion
Historians of ancient Rome
Latin–French translators
University of Paris alumni
Academic staff of the University of Paris
Academic staff of the Université de Montréal
Academic staff of the University of Fribourg
Academic staff of the University of Poitiers